Lorenzo Emile Charles (November 25, 1963 – June 27, 2011) was an American college and professional basketball player. A native of Brooklyn, New York, Charles played basketball for North Carolina State University and scored the game-winning points in the championship game of the 1983 NCAA Division I men's basketball tournament. He played briefly in the National Basketball Association and for several professional teams in Europe. Charles died in a bus accident on June 27, 2011, at age 47.

Biography
Lorenzo Charles was born in Brooklyn, New York to Panamanian immigrants. He was a 1981 graduate of Brooklyn Technical High School and played college basketball at North Carolina State University in Raleigh. During his sophomore season with the Wolfpack, Charles scored the game-winning set-back dunk off an airball shot Dereck Whittenburg in the final seconds of the championship game of the 1983 NCAA Tournament. The basket broke a 52–52 tie at The Pit in Albuquerque, New Mexico, as NC State scored the last eight points to defeat the top-ranked and heavily favored Houston Cougars, led by Hakeem "The Dream" Olajuwon, Clyde "The Glide" Drexler and the rest of Phi Slama Jama.

Charles blossomed into a star in his next two seasons for the Wolfpack. After packing on another  of muscle, he averaged 18 points and more than eight rebounds a game in 1983–84, becoming a third-team All-American. As a senior, Charles  averaged 18 points a game and grabbed more than six rebounds as NC State finished the regular season tied for first-place with a 9–5 conference record in the Atlantic Coast Conference. The Wolfpack advanced to the Elite Eight in the 1985 NCAA Tournament, but fell 69–60 in the West region finals to St. John's University, led by player of the year Chris Mullin. Charles' number 43 was honored by the NC State program in 2008, 25 years after his most-famous dunk.

Charles was the 41st selection in the 1985 NBA Draft at age 21 and went on to have a modest professional career, playing briefly in the NBA with the Atlanta Hawks. He later played with several European teams, particularly in Italy for Arexons Cantù and Irge Desio.

Charles died at the age of 47 in a bus crash on Interstate 40 in Raleigh on June 27, 2011.  He was at the controls of an Elite Coach rental bus, without passengers. Charles was interred at Oakwood Cemetery in Raleigh.

References

External links
 
 
 Lorenzo Charles' Lost Lettermen Interviews
 

1963 births
2011 deaths
African-American basketball players
All-American college men's basketball players
American sportspeople of Panamanian descent
American expatriate basketball people in Argentina
American expatriate basketball people in Italy
American expatriate basketball people in Sweden
American expatriate basketball people in Turkey
American expatriate basketball people in Uruguay
American men's basketball players
Atlanta Hawks draft picks
Atlanta Hawks players
Basketball players from New York City
Brooklyn Technical High School alumni
Liga ACB players
NC State Wolfpack men's basketball players
Oklahoma City Cavalry players
Pallacanestro Cantù players
Quad City Thunder players
Rapid City Thrillers players
Road incident deaths in North Carolina
Small forwards
Sportspeople from Brooklyn
American expatriate basketball people in Spain